Parliamentary elections will be held in Croatia on or before 22 July 2024 to elect the members of the 11th Sabor.

Electoral system

The 151 members of the Croatian Parliament are elected from 10 geographical and two special electoral districts: 
140 seats are elected in ten geographical 14-seat electoral districts (1st–10th Electoral Districts) by open list proportional representation (using a 5% electoral threshold) with seats allocated using the d'Hondt method
3 seats are elected in a special electoral district (11th Electoral District) for Croatian citizens living abroad  
8 seats are elected from an electoral district for national minorities (12th Electoral District): 3 seats for Serbian, 1 seat for Italian, 1 seat for Hungarian, 1 seat for Czech and Slovak, 1 seat for Albanian, Bosniak, Macedonian, Montenegrin and Slovenian, and 1 seat for Austrian, Bulgarian, German, Jewish, Polish, Roma, Romanian, Rusyn, Russian, Turkish, Ukrainian and Vlach national minority

On 28 October 2022 the Constitutional Court issued a warning that it could declare the next elections unconstitutional unless the electoral law was changed, due to excessive differences in the number of voters for each constituency, leading to significant variations in vote weight. On 7 February 2023 the Constitutional Court repealed the electoral law because the difference in vote weight between different electoral districts was too large to comply with the constitutional provision that each vote must be of equal weight.

Opinion polls

Notes

References

Elections in Croatia
Croatia